John A. C. Menton (September 4, 1866 – December 24, 1947) was an American politician, the only Socialist mayor of Flint, Michigan (1911–1912). Menton was not only a member of the Socialist Party of America, he was also secretary-treasurer of the Central Labor Council and president of the local Cigar Makers' Union, one of the largest in the city. In 1906 and 1910 he ran unsuccessfully as a Socialist candidate for U.S. Representative from Michigan, 6th District.

Due to a coalition of the Democratic Party, Republican Party, General Motors Corporation and Charles S. Mott in the so-called Independent Citizen's Party, Menton was decisively defeated in the 1912 election, never to serve again.

See also
List of elected socialist mayors in the United States

External links
Socialist Party of Michigan

References

1866 births
1947 deaths
Mayors of Flint, Michigan
Socialist Party of America politicians from Michigan
20th-century American politicians